Patricia Williams (born April 2, 1972), better known by her stage name Ms. Pat, is an American stand-up comedian and actress known for The Ms. Pat Show, and host of the podcast The Patdown with Ms. Pat.

Career

Comedy
Ms. Pat started doing comedy after being encouraged by her caseworker. She did her first stand-up in 2002 in Atlanta. In 2006, her career as a comic elevated to the next stage after moving to Indianapolis with her husband, where she improved her comedic skills at Morty's, a well-known comic store.

In 2015, she participated in the ninth season of NBC's Last Comic Standing.

Ms. Pat has appeared on popular shows and podcasts hosted by Kevin Hart, Marc Maron, Joe Rogan, Eddie Ifft, Bert Kreischer, Joey "CoCo" Diaz, Bobby Lee and Ari Shaffir. She is also a frequent guest talent on the comedy Bob and Tom Show.

In 2017, she released her first stand-up album, Rabbit. In 2018, she appeared in Netflix's stand-up series The Degenerates. On February 8, 2022, Netflix released her hour-long comedy special, "Ms. Pat: Y'all Wanna Hear Something Crazy?"

TV show
After getting dropped by Fox and Hulu, a TV show based on her life was picked up by the premium streaming service BET+ in October 2020 & premiered on August 12, 2021, as The Ms. Pat Show, its first season consists of 10 episodes. Stage actor J. Bernard Calloway plays her husband and Tami Roman plays her sister.
The series was renewed for a second season on September 2, 2021.

Author
She is the co-author of Rabbit – The Autobiography of Ms. Pat, a comical autobiography of her turbulent upbringing. The book was a finalist for the NAACP Image Award for Outstanding Literature in 2018.

Podcast Host 
In 2019, Ms. Pat began hosting a podcast available on YouTube titled The Patdown with Ms. Pat. In the podcast, Ms. Pat discuses day-to-day issues with her co-hosts, sometimes telling stories of her lived experiences which raise awareness of racial prejudice.

Personal life
Patricia Williams was born in Atlanta, Georgia, on April 2, 1972. She gave birth to her first child at 14 and her second at 15. The father of her first two children was eight years her senior; he began sexually abusing her when she was 12 years old. Earlier in childhood, she also suffered sexual abuse from one of her mother's boyfriends. At age 15, she began selling crack cocaine in Atlanta, while supporting herself and her two children using the street name "Rabbit".

Her two younger children were conceived later in life with her husband, Garrett. She then later adopted four children who are the biological children of her sister. She is open about having two abortions in her teenage years.

References

External links

1972 births
Living people
Actresses from Atlanta
Comedians from Georgia (U.S. state)
American television actresses
American sketch comedians
American stand-up comedians
American women comedians
American women podcasters
American podcasters
American autobiographers
African-American actresses
African-American female comedians
American drug traffickers
20th-century African-American women
21st-century African-American women
21st-century American actresses
21st-century American comedians